Luganda is a standardized language based on four closely related languages of western Uganda:

Luganda or Luganda 
Luga (Flow) or Luganda
Luganda or Buganda
Luganda or Luganda

Jouni Filip Maho's 2009 New Updated Guthrie List Online calls it an artificial language, while Ethnologue calls it "standardized" and "hybrid".

The Google interface has been translated into Kitara in February 2010 by the Faculty of Computing and IT, Makerere University. It is also used in the Orumuri newspaper, published by New Vision Group.

See also
Nyoro-Tooro
Nkore-Kiga
Rutara languages

References

Relevant Literature
Tumusiime, James. 2007. Entanda y'omugambi w'Orunyankore-Rukiga. Kampala, Uganda: Fountain Publishers. [a collection of proverbs, entire book is written in the language, with no English]

External links
PanAfrican L10n page on Runyakitara

Languages of Uganda

Constructed languages introduced in the 1990s
Zonal constructed languages